Basche is a surname. Notable people with the surname include:

Bob Basche, American television producer
David Alan Basche (born 1968), American actor

See also
Basch